Oy Rabbit Films LTD is a Finnish TV production and distribution company, founded by The Dudesons – Jarno Laasala, Jukka Hildén, Jarppi Leppälä and HP Parviainen.

As of 2017, it is the largest television production company in Finland. In the past years, Rabbit Films has produced 24 different prime time shows for networks In addition to its original formats, the company also makes local adaptions of the international formats such as Saturday Night Live, Dragons' Den, Who Wants to Be a Millionaire and The Lyrics Board.

The company is currently led by CEO Olli Suominen. Other executives and directors include Jaana Pasonen, Tuomas Summanen, Jasmine Patrakka, Suvi Valkonen, and Minna Haapkylä.

As of 2021, Rabbit Films is listed in 56 people's profiles on LinkedIn. It distributes its own formats and finished programmes through its own distribution entity, Rabbit Formats.

Productions

 King, live comedy on TV talent shows
 Posse, live TV show combining talk show and comedy
 Comedian and 7 Wonders, comedian conquers the world
 Celebrity Home Invasion
 Pop'n'Roll, music comedy panel
 Think Thank, twisted news comedy panel
 Ultimate Expedition, docureality where 8 celebrities are given a challenge to conquer a 20.000-foot-high mountain.
 Haggle Battle, bargain battle meets comedy panel show
 The Box, a live gaming show with YouTube superstars
 Should I Be Worried?, comedy panel show
 Once Upon a Life, family quiz meets panel show
 Battle of the Hits, music entertainment
 City vs Country, game show 
 Over the Atlantic, adventure reality
 Globetrotters, adventure reality
 Queen of the Day, entertainment
 Don't You Know Who I Am, game show
 The Awards Show, entertainment
 conWEBsation, comedy panel show

International distribution

The Dudesons series, 5 season in over 150 countries
Kill Arman, 2 seasons in over 80 countries
Madventures, in over 150 countries
Beyond Human Boundaries, 3 seasons

YouTube channel
Rabbit Films co-owns the first Finnish YouTube network called Troot Network, and manages The Dudesons YouTube page with nearly 5 million subscribers.

Awards

Finnish TV Awards: The Dudesons 2010, Celebrity Home Invasion 2013, Posse 2014, Ultimate Expedition 2016, Who Wants to Be a Millionaire 2018
European Pitch Competition: Celebrity Home Invasion
Format of the Year Competition: Celebrity Home Invasion 2012, King 2015, Globetrotters 2018

Sources

External links
 Rabbit Films website 
  An article on a Finnish newspaper about Kill Arman's distribution deal to 104 countries.
  Madventures sold to National Geographic
    Dudesons In America on MTV
 Jonathan Tuovinen joins Rabbit Films as Head of International

Television production companies of Finland